East Trinity is a coastal locality in the Cairns Region, Queensland, Australia. It was formerly known as Trinity East.

The town of Giangurra is on the northern coast of the locality.

Geography 

The locality of East Trinity has the locality of Glen Boughton enclosed within it.

The northern boundary of East Trinity is the Coral Sea. The western boundary is Trinity Inlet. The south-western boundary is Pine Creek. The eastern boundary is the Murray Prior Range. 

Parts of the land, water and environment in and around East Trinity have been subject to acid sulfate soil oxidisation. Acid sulfate soil remediation has been implemented to fix the impacts of soil oxidisation to the land, water and environment in East Trinity.

Mountains 
East Trinity has the following mountains, all of which are in the Murray Prior Range along the locality's eastern boundary (from north to south):
 Mount Yarrabah 
Mount Murray Prior 
Mount Gorton 
May Peak

Bays and headlands 
Offshore are a number of bays and headlands (from west to east):

 Trinity Bay, to the west of False Cape, named after Trinity Sunday (10 June 1770) by Lieutenant James Cook on the HM Bark Endeavour, including side bays (from west to east):
 Trinity Inlet,
Stafford Point
 Rolling Bay
Bessie Point
 Sturt Cove
Lyons Point
 Brown Bay
 Sunny Bay
False Cape
Mission Bay to the east of False Cape

History
East Trinity is situated in the Yidinji traditional Aboriginal country.

Prior to 2002, the locality was known as Trinity East.

In 2020, there have been proposals for a satellite city urban development, the construction of a bridge/tunnel linking Cairns City to East Trinity, and eco-tourism proposals.

Heritage listings 
East Trinity has the following heritage listings:
 Bessie Point, off Pine Creek-Yarrabah Road: Hydrographic Survey Bench Mark
 Yarrabah Road: False Cape Battery

Education

There are no schools in East Trinity. The nearest government primary schools are Yarrabah State School in neighbouring Yarrabah to the north-east and Gordonvale State School in Gordonvale to the south. The nearest government secondary schools are Yarrabah State School (to Year 10 only) and Gordonvale State High School in Gordonvale.

References

External links 

Suburbs of Cairns
Localities in Queensland
Coastline of Queensland